Eretmocera scatospila is a moth of the family Scythrididae. It was described by Philipp Christoph Zeller in 1852. It is found in Botswana, Democratic Republic of Congo (Equateur, West Kasai, Bas Congo, Katanga, Orientale), Gambia, Ghana, Kenya, Namibia, Nigeria and South Africa (Limpopo, Gauteng, KwaZulu-Natal).

The larvae have been recorded feeding on Amaranthus viridis, Glycine max, Urena lobata, Gossypium, Thunbergia and Clerodendrum species.

References

 images of typus: Swedish Museum of Natural History
Original description in: Zeller P. C. 1852b. Lepidoptera Microptera, quae J. A. Wahlberg in Caffrorum terra collegit. - — :1–120.

scatospila
Moths described in 1852